Claibourne is an unincorporated community in Claibourne Township, Union County, Ohio, United States.

History
Claibourne was platted in 1881 when the railroad was extended to that point. A post office was established at Claibourne in 1879, and remained in operation until 1947.

References 

Unincorporated communities in Union County, Ohio
Unincorporated communities in Ohio